Nephrin is a protein necessary for the proper functioning of the renal filtration barrier. The renal filtration barrier consists of fenestrated endothelial cells, the glomerular basement membrane, and the podocytes of epithelial cells. Nephrin is a transmembrane protein that is a structural component of the slit diaphragm. They are present on the tips of the podocytes as an intricate mesh and convey strong negative charges which repel protein from crossing into the Bowman's space. 

A defect in the gene for nephrin, NPHS1, is associated with congenital nephrotic syndrome of the Finnish type and causes massive amounts of protein to be leaked into the urine, or proteinuria. Nephrin is also required for cardiovascular development.

Interactions 
Nephrin has been shown to interact with:
 CASK,
 CD2AP, 
 CDH3 and 
 CTNND1, 
 FYN, 
 KIRREL,  and
 NPHS2.

See also 
 Podocyte

References

Further reading

External links 
 

Proteins